John Henry MacCracken (September 30, 1875 – February 1, 1948) was an American academic administrator who served as president of Westminster College and Lafayette College. When he was chosen as president of Westminster College in 1899, MacCracken was the youngest college president in the United States. MacCracken was the son of Henry MacCracken, a chancellor of New York University, and the brother of Henry Noble MacCracken, a president of Vassar College.

Early life
MacCracken was born in Rochester, Vermont, to Henry MacCracken, a chancellor of New York University (NYU), and the former Catherine Almira Hubbard. He was a descendant of Irish immigrants to Pennsylvania in the mid-18th century. His brother Henry Noble MacCracken became president of Vassar College. John Henry MacCracken attended college preparatory school in New York City.

When he was 15, MacCracken enrolled at NYU and he completed an undergraduate degree in 1894, when he was named class valedictorian. He pursued graduate study at NYU and the Union Theological Seminary before earning a Ph.D. at the Martin Luther University of Halle-Wittenberg in Germany.

Career
He joined the NYU faculty in 1896 and was promoted to assistant professor shortly before accepting the role of president at Westminster College in 1899. At the time of his election to the presidency at Westminster College, an NYU source said that the appointment would make him the youngest college president in the United States.

When MacCracken came to Westminster, his age raised alarm among some of the supporters of the university, and his modest personality and quiet nature did not immediately assuage his doubters. Within a few months, MacCracken secured $20,000 in donations for the university, and he was able to increase the variety of academic offerings at the school. When the university's chair of Bible and metaphysics resigned, President MacCracken was named the Sauser Chair of Philosophy and Christian Apologetics. A formal presidential inauguration was held for MacCracken in June 1900.

MacCracken left Westminster College in 1903 to return to NYU as a syndic and professor of politics. He taught one of the earliest courses in city planning in the United States, and he served as vice president of the university senate.  In 1914, MacCracken was vice president of the trustees of the American Institute of Christian Philosophy. His father was president.

In 1915, MacCracken was selected as president of Lafayette College. The school's physical plant increased in value under MacCracken, who served until 1927.

During his time as president of Lafayette College, MacCracken was one of the founding advisors during the creation of Alpha Phi Omega, the largest collegiate fraternity in the United States.

Personal
MacCracken married Edith Constable in 1910. MacCracken's father-in-law, Frederick Augustus Constable, managed Arnold Constable & Company in New York, and he was the son of one of the store's original partners. MacCracken's daughter Louise married Robert Olmsted, a trustee of Vassar College and the namesake of the school's biological sciences building. His son Constable was a graduate of Harvard University and Columbia Law School.

Active in the Presbyterian faith, MacCracken spent nearly ten years as president of the Presbyterian college board. He represented the church as a delegate at world conferences in Lausanne, Oxford and Edinburgh.

Death
MacCracken died at his Manhattan home on February 1, 1948. He was survived by his wife, daughter, son and brother.

References

External links

1875 births
1948 deaths
People from Rochester, Vermont
New York University alumni
Martin Luther University of Halle-Wittenberg alumni
New York University faculty
Presidents of Lafayette College
Alpha Phi Omega founders
Lafayette College trustees
Union Theological Seminary (New York City) alumni